Snowshoe Peak is a mountain in the U.S. state of Montana. At , it is the highest peak in the Cabinet Mountains of Northwestern Montana and Idaho.


See also

List of mountain peaks of North America
List of mountain peaks of the United States
List of Ultras of the United States

References

External links

 "Snowshoe Peak, Montana" on Peakbagger
 "Snowshoe Peak" on Summitpost

Mountains of Lincoln County, Montana
Mountains of Montana
Mountains of Sanders County, Montana
Kootenai National Forest